REAP may refer to:

Government and organisations
 Reserve Educational Assistance Program, Chapter 1607 (G.I. Bill of Rights), a Department of Defense education benefit program
 Re-Engineering Assessment Practices, one of six projects funded under the Scottish Funding Council's E-learning Transformation Programme
 Resource and Energy Analysis Programme, a specialist programme of the Stockholm Environment Institute
 Rice Exporters Association of Pakistan, a Pakistani business association

Other uses
 The Reap, a 1997 arcade shooter computer game
 Rounding Errors in Algebraic Processes, a mathematical book by James H. Wilkinson published in 1963
 "Reap", a song by The Red Jumpsuit Apparatus from the album Am I the Enemy

See also
 Reaper (disambiguation)
 Reaping (disambiguation)